The 2023 G20 New Delhi summit (Hindi: 2023 G20 नई दिल्ली शिखर सम्मेलन)  is the upcoming eighteenth meeting of Group of Twenty (G20), a summit scheduled to take place in International Exhibition-Convention Centre (IECC), Pragati Maidan, New Delhi in 2023. It is the first ever G20 summit to be hosted in India and also in South Asia .

Presidency 
The G20 New Delhi Summit will be chaired by the Indian Prime Minister, Narendra Modi.

India's presidency began on 1 December 2022, leading up to the summit in the third quarter of 2023. The presidency handover ceremony was held as an intimate event, in which the G20 Presidency gavel was transferred from Indonesian President Joko Widodo to Indian Prime Minister Narendra Modi at the close of the Bali summit. Indonesia held the presidency in 2022.

The India’s G20 Presidency would guide the work of the G20 under the theme of  - “Vasudhaiva Kutumbakam” or “One Earth · One Family · One Future” -  drawn from the Sanskrit phrase of the Maha Upanishad , which means "The World Is One Family". Essentially, the theme affirms the value of all life – human, animal, plant, and microorganisms – and their interconnectedness on the planet Earth and in the wider universe.

Agenda priorities 
G20 India has put forth six agenda priorities for the G20 dialogue in 2023:-

 Green Development, Climate Finance & LiFE

 Accelerated, Inclusive & Resilient Growth 
 Accelerating progress on SDGs
 Technological Transformation & Digital Public Infrastructure
 Multilateral Institutions for the 21st century
 Women-led development

Background 
Originally India was scheduled to host the G20 summit in 2021 and Italy in 2022.At the 2018 G20 Summit in Argentina, Prime Minister Narendra Modi said he had requested Italy to host the summit in 2021 and allow India to host it in 2022, on the occasion of the 75th year of India’s independence. Italy agreed to let India host the G20 summit in 2022 in its place owing to the momentum in bilateral ties. 

But after request made by Indonesian Foreign Minister Retno Marsudi, India exchanged its presidency of the G-20 with Indonesia because Indonesia would also chair the Association of Southeast Asian Nations (ASEAN) in 2023.

Expected participating leaders

Invited guests

Participating international organization guests

B20 India Participants

References

21st-century diplomatic conferences (Global)
G20 summits
2023 conferences
2023 in India
2023 in international relations
New Delhi
Diplomatic conferences in India
September 2023 events in Asia